Martinus Hendrikus Hogervorst-Benders (born 23 July 1971, Helmond) is a Dutch poet and philosopher, and chief editor of literary magazine De Honingzaag

Benders published his first poetry book titled 'Karavanserai' in 2008, with Nieuw Amsterdam publishers. He got nominated for the prestigious Buddingh prize for the book, but staged a Laibach-esque performance on the awards, where Bart van der Pligt read an Anti-Price poem and Samuel Vriezen wearing a fake moustache yelled the prize had to be taken seriously from within the audience. Benders sang 'Lezen is Lezen' ('Reading is reading') from a dark corner, to the tune of the known 'Life is Life' song of the Austrian band Opus.

In 2011 Benders sabotaged the National Turing Poetry contest by simultaneously sending in poems that ended in the top 100, sending in a song about Jury Member Gerrit Komrij Kom nou Mr Komrij based on Frankly Mr Shankly of the Smiths) and making an alternate character named 'Bert' that severely criticized the quality of the top 100. Ramsey Nasr, the National Poet, gave a raving speech against 'Bert' at the nominations Gala day, not knowing it was Benders, and claimed Bert was just jealous for not making it into the Top 100.

After this successful action Benders vowed to stop this particular artform. He left his publisher and self-published a second volume of poetry named 'Wat koop ik voor jouw donkerwilde machten, Willem' ('What do I buy for your darkwilde powers, William') with 91 poems, which got raving reviews on major poetry sites but was ignored by the poetry magazine establishment.

In February 2013 Benders, as a situationist artwork, put a Bill Knott poem into the Turing National Poetry contest. Benders was present with 2 poems in the Top 20, but sent the Sesame Street character 'Bert' to collect the nomination. The jury took several ressentimental jibes at Bert, which he recorded and remixed into a video named '36 Euro'.

Much of Benders’ work combines not only literary styles, such as lyrical, conceptual, satirical, and absurdist influences; his work also moves across genres, media and modes. Some examples are: his Laibach-inspired performance at a poetry award including an Anti-Prize poem and choreographed chants from within the audience, and a fake moustache; several submissions to poetry contests intended as playful self-referential critique of poetry institutions and contests as such; Wôld, Wôld, Wôld! (2013) a personalized poetry book, including dedications and assignments to the reader, poems in Dutch and English, concrete poems, images. Stubbing Out a Cigarette on a Nightingale will be Benders’ first English language poetry collection. In 2014, Dutch publisher van Gennep has republished some of Benders’ works that had only been available as self-published prints.

Benders published five books with van Gennep but in 2019 after a discussion with Ruud Poppelaars and Monique van der Kubbe he decided to get involved in the new publishing house De Kaneelfabriek, a name loosely based on a novel by Bruno Schulz. He has since published Baah Baaah Krakschaap/ De P van Winterslaap there, a counterprinted experimental volume of poetry that managed to sell out two prints, unique for such experimental poetry.

In 2020/2021 Benders published a Gaelic based collection of 'magical poetry' Ginneninne that infused the Dutch language with Gaelic and Irish-based neologisms. He subsequently mailed the book to critics with a tab of 1cp-LSD inside, since critic Piet Gerbrandy in his review of Baah Baaah Krakschaap had written that 'sober analysis does not yield too much result'.

Karavanserai 
In May 2009, Benders was nominated for the C. Buddingh'-prijs for Dutch-language poetry with Karavanserai. However, he performed a Laibach-like performance together with Bart van der Pligt entitled 'Lezen is Lezen' with the Lorcaesque slogan 'The criticism is the tragic constant in the face of the Prize', a variation on 'The moustache is the tragic constant in the face of the man', a comment Lorca made on Hitler. (1) The composer Samuel Vriezen stood up during the performance with a fake moustache stuck on screaming 'the Buddingh' Prize must be taken seriously!' 
Erik Lindner in De Groene Amsterdammer calls this a courageous debut ('Martijn Benders has something few poets have: guts']) and compares Benders to Tonnus Oosterhof, by his own admission the first time such a comparison has struck him. (2)

What do I buy for your dark-wild powers, William 
In 2011, Benders founded his own publishing house Loewak, named after his active weblog. This is where his second collection What do I buy for your dark-wild powers, Willem was published. This collection contains a number of poems that Benders composed via email with others: Samuel Vriezen, Eva Cox, Bart van der Pligt and Morphin van Geeuwen, among others. Immediately after the publication of the collection, Christian professor Tom van Deel launched the attack via the review service Biblion, intended for libraries. According to van Deel, the 'Willem' in the title referred to Willem Thies, and was now typical network poetry by network poets.  
However, Gerrit Komrij in his Poetry Calendar calls Benders 'one of the greatest talents of our time', and he observes that 'The supervisors who hand out the talent cards are too busy in their own playgrounds to read Benders'.  
In the Groene Amsterdammer, Piet Gerbrandy called the collection 'outstanding'.

Bert in the Turing 

Benders, under the pseudonym 'Bert', delivered strong criticism of the Turing National Poetry Contest in 2010. The same year, he submitted a song Kom nou Mijnheer Komrij (2), while Komrij was on the jury. The song failed to make the top 1000. Ramsey Nasr, who was Dichter des Vaderlands (Nederland) at the time, launched a tirade against 'Bert' in 2011 in the opening speech of the festivity, which he said was jealous because he himself could not make the top 100. Benders responded by sending a Alexis de Roode dressed in a Bert costume onto the stage in 2012. One of those poems was an adaptation of a poem by Bill Knott, the unsung American poet who always complained that he never got into the prizes.

Wôld, Wôld, Wôld! 
This was followed in 2013 by the voluminous collection Wôld, Wôld, Wôld!, which Benders himself said was the world's first personalised book of poetry. The poetry collection provided commentary on the reader's life, which Benders managed by spying on the reader before each order. At the same time, Benders published a list of 50 prominent literature lovers who were not allowed to buy the book.By his own admission, the full list also complied with that command. WWW was also the first poetry collection in the Netherlands with its own unboxing video.(4) In the collection, Piet Gerbrandy provides live commentary on the poems contained in facebook balloons.

Reissue 
In 2013, he fell into a divorce and was forced to return to the Netherlands, moving in with his parents, addicted to alcohol. Until that point, he managed to make ends meet on his own, but that was no longer the case and knocking on the Dutch Foundation for Literature's door, they informed him that he could only qualify for a work grant if he republished his previous collection with what they called a 'regular' publisher there. Benders did so after talking to van Gennep publishers: 'What do I buy for your dark-wild powers, Willem' is one of the few collections that appeared first as a POD and then as a regular edition. And although Benders had also generously sent his own publication to newspapers and magazines, these indeed turned out to be impressed by the collection only after it appeared with a regular publisher, because all the reviews above except Komrij are from the regular publication.

Stubbing Out a Nightingale on a Cigarette 
Berlin publisher Vlak published an English-language collection that Benders had co-composed with American poet Dale Houstman, a poet he knew from the alt.arts.poetry.comments newsgroup. Concept of the collection was a seemingly endless foreword by Houstman that provided the collection with a hostile Takeover - at the same time, Benders enlisted the website Fiverr.com to have all kinds of Americans attack prominent American poets through a promotional video via a rap. That a White European could buy coloured Americans for $5 to attack White American Poets was, according to Benders, a textbook example of the "laziness" preached by Kenneth Goldsmith as a method of achieving poetry.

The essential Martinus Benders 
Publishing house Stanza, run by experimental poet Ton van 't Hof published The Essential Martinus Benders. However, Benders submitted only new poems written in a week to symbolise that, as far as he is concerned, the essential lies in working itself. The collection includes a retranslation of a song by Georges Brassens, Supplique pour être enterré à la plage de Sète.

The Book of the Dead Owls 
In 2015, Benders published a personal anthology featuring the work of a variety of international poets he admires called Book of the Dead Owls. The work and his translation evoked enthusiastic responses including from Menno Wigman, who travelled from Amsterdam to camping de Zwarte Bergen to recite the poem by Czesław Miłosz A confession in the caravan at a party on 11 September 2017.(5)

Sauseschritt 
A voluminous volume with a book of poetry inside that you have to read with a magnifying glass. The title comes from a playful German pop song by the formation DÖF, and the collection includes translations of two European masterpieces: The Dead House by Yannis Ritsos, and The Boy Who Turned into a Deer Screams Through the Secret Gate by Hungarian poet Ferenc Juhász. As if an angel played with it, Juhasz died the same year. Most of the literary discussion provoked by this 220-page collection was about the secret part that had to be read with a magnifying glass.

Lippenspook 
This collection contains partly reworked poems from the collection Wôld, Wôld, Wôld!, supplemented by new works. In the magazine Awater, Thomas Möhlmann called it one of the best collections of the year. His colleague Pim te Bokkel notes in the same magazine that This is not poetry that cares about a review in a magazine like "Awater", where peers discuss each other from often different backgrounds and poetics. This is poetry where, as a reader, you are left in suspense because you have no idea what the next page will bring.

Flierman's Passage 
A novel in which the writers' caste are the unwanted assholes of the 1%? In which they meekly 'evolve' along with the psychotic delusions of a PVV-like boor, all contained in a kind of Disney fable that is patently fake. Poet Alexis de Roode writes on Goodreads: "Flierman's Passage" is a scathing book, in a Dadaist sense. An absurdist, at times hilarious, at times also repulsive allegory of a Western society that has lost all its coherence, where all spiritual values have long since been effectively demolished, where all writers are poseurs pretending to each other that there is still something to defend, find or reveal, where fascists and democrats, people who defend values and people who attack values, are interchangeable and randomly dive into bed with each other, where ethical issues only have a meaning as a fetish. At the end, the two-headed scheming duo, Jos and Chamiel, walk into the bike shed as a happy love pair, just as sometime during 2020 Baudet and Rutte will walk into the bike shed together, "two lost souls who found each other in a morgue".Flierman's passage is an aptly absurdist parable for today's hollowed-out, de-spiritualised Netherlands, a nihilistic and outrageous fairy tale by one of the worst freethinkers among Dutch poets. Ironically, afterwards the ex-girlfriend of Thierry Baudet discussed the book in de Volkskrant, from a kind of recipe idea for literature: a bit of humour + a bit of seriousness, and the novel is done. According to Bo van Houwelingen, there was too much humour in the book.

Nachtefteling 
Benders broke his Achilles tendon after a fall in Istanbul, he had to spend a month in plaster, and during that month, in great pain, he wrote the collection Nachtefteling, in which a whole new kind of language breaks through in the middle of the collection, a whole new style. The collection is based on the business plan to open a Nachtefteling, a plan for which he still sat down with Steven Brunswijk.

Baah Baaah Krakschaap 
After a period of heavy alcoholism in the Black Mountains combined with the benzodiazepine Lorazepam, Benders was lying down one winter night and a moth started fluttering in his face in the middle of the night. Suddenly, he remembered the words of one of the characters from Carlos Castaneda's worldview, Don Juan de Matos, who said that moths "carry the dust of infinity on their wings" and he decided to stop the benzodiazepine, and subsequently the alcohol, immediately, all on his own. The double collection Baah Baaah Krakschaap / The P of Winter Sleep is written entirely from the perspective of a swarm of moths. The title is taken from an English children's song, and also a song by Sleaford Mods, and on the cover the P of Wintersleep is shaped like a scythe. Benders moved to Noordwijkerhout after finding a new love, Veronique Hogervorst. After his arrival, the house was full of all kinds of moths for a year, and Benders wrote the collection between them. In the Volkskrant, swinging critic Arjan Peters discussed the collection, calling it better than T.S. Eliot.

The Cinnamon Factory 
After publishing house Atlas Contact informed him that Baah Baaah Krakschaap did not resemble other Dutch-language poetry enough and thus could not be good for their logic, Benders had seen it with the canal-belt publishing houses and approached Ruud Poppelaars and Monique van der Kubbe with the idea of starting a publishing house that would deal with literature in a less monotonous and uniform way. Stichting de Kaneelfabriek was founded in 2018 and they published some 30 books in four years. Benders works mainly as a designer for the Foundation. He also became editor-in-chief of the literary-philosophical magazine De Honingzaag.

Ginneninne 
A Christmas collection full of Celtic lyricism, which Benders sent with a seal 1cp-LSD to some critics, including Piet Gerbrandy who had written about Baah Baaah Krakschaap "that sober analysis doesn't amount to much". When professor Marc van Oostendorp sat typing a very positive review of the collection on Christmas Eve, Benders refused to read it. According to Benders 'because on Christmas Eve the LSD gate would close', referring to the seal that van Oostendorp had not used, despite promising to do so. Although Benders used LSD in his teens, this collection was actually written under the influence of the San Pedro Cactus, according to the collection itself, the cactus was final editor.

Lack of secularism 
According to Benders, a small network of Christian professors who constantly pass the ball to each other is responsible for literature remaining so religious while the population has long since secularised. According to Benders, controlling which stories can survive is a necessity for a sect largely made up of paedophile criminals, and for that reason there is a great interest from within that sect to 'control literature'. That they do this through prizes and other means is clear from Marc van Oostendorp's piece on the site Neerlandistiek: after all, why would professors 'refuse to have anything to do with a poet' (6) According to Benders, this not only shows a lack of secularism but these Christians also abuse the Woke-narrative by doing one-twos: someone of colour is alternated with a Christian poet, and thus you can appear progressive with a heavily conservative agenda.

Tract of the Sun 
The podcast 'De Nieuwe Contrabas' features Traktaat van de Zon, a leaden, 712-page collected work. Chrétien Breukers and Hans van Willigenburg are surprised that this remarkable poet is not mentioned anywhere. The design of Traktaat van de Zon was inspired by the work of Swans, an experimental music group of which Benders is a loyal fan.

What the Piranha dreams about in the Lemonade Ditch 
A 420-page philosophical book about fantasy, magic and the brainwashing techniques of modern society. According to Benders, what we call 'modern man' is a spawn of dark powers, who manage and control a huge bio-farm of humans. Through drugs and chemicals, this entity created a docile population that cannot concentrate and thus cannot think or read, and is barely able to formulate a coherent sequence of thoughts in succession. Through a meteoric devolution caused, among other things, by poor nutrition and manipulated receptors, a dystopia took shape that fantasy cannot escape. The book contains a number of hypotheses that are unique: for instance, the philosopher Heraclitus is said to have written not a philosophical work but 'the world's first trip report' on the Fly agaric, and Benders also has a hypothesis that it was a precursor of the fly agaric that caused fish to live on land through the Repetitive Movement Syndrome.

O Kolle Klokkespin 
This collection has not been reviewed anywhere because Benders refuses to send any more poetry collections to newspapers, magazines and websites. This is because, in his own words, he 'has had enough reviews already' and he does not understand what purpose it serves to constantly 'have to conquer your place'. In Kolle Klokkespin includes a New Creation story set in the Giant Mountains in Poland called The Sieve Dance and based on the Literal Video Version of the 1980s song Safety Dance by Men Without Hats.

Poems to Read in the Dark 
Benders came up with the title back in 2020, according to his weblog, so it's not a commentary on skyrocketing energy bills, it's coincidence, or prophecy. But whatever it may be, Benders promises on his weblog to provide the new collection for free in December to people who cannot pay their energy bills and therefore cannot buy books.

References

External links 

Website of De Kaneelfabriek

1971 births
Living people
Dutch male poets
People from Helmond